Angela Steinmüller (born 15 April 1941, in Schmalkalden) is a German mathematician and science fiction author.  Together with her husband Karlheinz Steinmüller she has written science fiction short stories and novels that depict human development on a cosmic scale, grounded in an analysis of social structures and mechanisms. Angela and Karlheinz Steinmüller were not only among the most widely read authors in the GDR, ranking at the top of a 1989 poll of most popular science fiction authors in the GDR, but their works continue to be republished.

Awards
 1993: Kurd-Laßwitz-Preis "Best short story" for Der Kerzenmacher
 1995: Kurd-Laßwitz-Preis "Best short story" for Leichter als Vakuum (with Karlheinz Steinmüller und Erik Simon)
 2001: German Fantasy Prize for die Verbreitung der phantastischen Literatur in zwei verschiedenen Gesellschaftssystemen sowie ihre Zukunftsperspektiven. (with Karlheinz Steinmüller)
 2004: Kurd-Laßwitz-Preis "Best short story" for Vor der Zeitreise (with Karlheinz Steinmüller)

Novels (with Karlheinz Steinmüller)

 Andymon. Eine Weltraum-Utopie, 1982
 Pulaster. Roman eines Planeten, 1986
 Der Traummeister, 1990
 Spera, 2004

References

External links
Angela & Karlheinz Steinmüller's home page

1941 births
Living people
People from Schmalkalden
People from Hesse-Nassau
East German writers
East German women
German science fiction writers
Writers from Thuringia
German women writers
German women short story writers
German short story writers
Women science fiction and fantasy writers
20th-century German women